Lewy Miall Pattinson (10 March 1852January 1944) was an English businessman, who founded the pharmaceutical firm Washington H. Soul Pattinson.

Early life and immigration from England

Lewy Miall Pattinson was born to parents Wiliam Pattinson and Annie Sinclair on 10 March 1852 at Hexham, Northumberland, England. He had three siblings William, Matthew and Annie. Pattinson married Mary Jane Parker in July 1887 at Tynemouth, England.

Pattinson had a background in engineering with the family company Pattinson and Davison, but latter gained exposure to the pharmaceutical industry through his brother William, which led him to explore opportunities in this field in Sydney, Australia which he visited in 1881. He bought "Hexham" at Abbotsford in 1900.

Founder of Washington H. Soul Pattinson

Pattinson returned to Australia for good in 1886 and opened a pharmacy in Balmain known as Pattinson and Co. The firm expanded to include stores in Redfern and North Sydney, and its own in-house manufacturing and distribution facilities.

In 1902 Pattinson & Company bought out his competitor W. H. Soul to expand the business further. The firm was listed on the Australian Stock Exchange in 1903 and is Australia's second oldest public company. Today it is a diversified conglomerate with investments in pharmaceuticals, telecommunications, minerals and financial services.

Death

In 1944 Lewy Pattinson died aged 91. He was succeeded by his four children William, Mary, Jenny-Ann and Lewy-Norman, and 12 grandchildren.

Pattinson's son Dr. William Frederick Pattinson succeeded him as Chairman of Washington H. Soul Pattinson. His grandson, Jim Millner  and great grandson, Robert Millner, were subsequently chairmen of the company.

Philanthropy

Lewy Pattinson was known for his community and charitable donations. He donated the L. M. Pattinson Aerial Ambulance which was the first aeroplane in the Royal Flying Doctor Service of Australia.

The Lewy Miall Pattinson Scholarship was founded in 1943 by a gift of £5000 from Pattinson and supplemented by a bequest of an additional sum of £5000 on his death in January 1944, for the encouragement of the study of pharmaceutical science at The University of Sydney.

There is a street named - Pattinson Crescent - in the suburb of Flynn, Australian Capital Territory.

References 

 

1852 births
1944 deaths
Australian businesspeople
British businesspeople
People from Hexham